Alinagar ("Ali city" in Indian languages) may refer to several places:
 A short-lived name during the history of Kolkata, India, set in 1756 by the Bengali ruler Siraj ud-Daulah.
 Treaty of Alinagar, signed in Kolkata in 1757
Alinagar (Vidhan Sabha constituency), an electoral district in Bihar, India.
 Alinagar, a union council in Beanibazar Upazila, Bangladesh.
 Ali Nagar Roda, a village in Punjab, Pakistan.
 Ali Nagar Pali, a village in Bihar, India.
 Alinagar, a village in Jinnaram Mendal, Medak district, Telangana, India.
 Alinagar, a village in Aonla, Uttar Pradesh, India